Cameroon Airlines was an airline from Cameroon, serving as flag carrier of the country. Based in Douala, it operated scheduled services within Africa, as well as to Europe and the Middle East out of its hub at Douala International Airport, with a second network focus on Yaoundé Nsimalen International Airport. The company was 96.43 percent state-owned, with the remaining shares having been held by Air France.

History 

Cameroon Airlines was founded in 1971 (it was operating as early as 1973) in an effort to create a national Cameroonian airline, as until then domestic and international flight operations at the airports in the country were mostly executed by multi-national Air Afrique. Scheduled flights between Douala and Yaoundé were launched on 1 November of that year with an initial fleet of two Boeing 737-200 aircraft. Shortly thereafter, international flights to Rome and Paris commenced using an ex-Air France Boeing 707, which was replaced by a larger and more modern Boeing 747-200 in 1982. (This aircraft remained in service with Cameroon Airlines until 2000 when it was severely damaged in Flight 070, see below.)

Over the years, Cameroon Airlines was plagued by financial difficulties, which came along with a poor safety and maintenance record. On 16 September 2005, the airline was indefinitely banned by the French Civil Aviation Authority from operating its Paris route.

In an effort to save the airline from bankruptcy, the Government of Cameroon signed an agreement with SN Airholding, the parent company of Brussels Airlines to ensure the future funding. The plans did not materialize, though. Instead, on 11 September 2006, the launch of Camair-Co as new national airline was announced. Cameroon Airlines stayed operational until March 2008, though flight operations had only taken place during irregular intervals over these last years.

Route network

During the 1970s
At that time, the Cameroon Airlines fleet consisted of two Boeing 737-200 and two Douglas DC-4 aircraft for short haul flights, as well as one Boeing 707-300 for long haul flights to Europe. Scheduled destinations included:

During the 1990s
Cameroon Airlines had scaled down the domestic route network in a cost-saving measure, relying on the larger sub-Saharan cities as well as some European destinations:

Fleet

Over the years, Cameroon Airlines operated the following aircraft types:

Accidents and incidents
On 31 October 1981, a Cameroon Airlines Twin Otter (registered TJ-CBC) did not gain sufficient altitude upon take-off at Bafoussam Airport because of a severe overload, causing the aircraft to crash, by which one passenger was killed. (There had been 22 passengers and two pilots on board).
On 30 August 1984, Cameroon Airlines Flight 786, a Boeing 737-200 registered TJ-CBD, experienced an engine explosion when taxiing at Douala International Airport prior to departure for Yaoundé. A fire from the damaged fuel tank engulfed the aircraft. Two passengers were trapped by the flames and died. The remaining 107 passengers and seven crew members were able to evacuate the plane.
On 28 June 1989 at 21:19 local time, a Cameroon Airlines Hawker Siddeley HS 748 (registered TJ-CCF) overshot the runway upon landing in stormy weather at Yaoundé International Airport following a scheduled flight from Douala and collided with an embankment, killing the two pilots and one of the 45 passengers on board.
On 3 December 1995 at 22:44 local time, Cameroon Airlines Flight 3701, which was operated by a Boeing 737-200 (registered TJ-CBE), crashed near Douala, killing 71 out of the 76 people on board in what marked the worst accident in the history of the airline. The aircraft had attempted to land at Douala International Airport following a flight from Cotonou, when it experienced a problem with the landing gear. During a go-around following a second landing attempt, the pilots chose a wrong thrust application for the engines, which led to the aircraft running out of control.
On 5 November 2000 at 20:57 local time, Cameroon Airlines Flight 070 from Douala to Paris, which was operated by a Boeing 747-200 (registered TJ-CAB), veered off the runway upon landing at Paris-Charles de Gaulle Airport, causing the front landing gear to be torn off and the aircraft being damaged beyond repair. All 187 passengers and 16 crew members could be evacuated. The cause for the accident was determined to be a differential thrust that had been caused by the failure of three of the four thrust reversers to deploy properly. Running against air accident regulations, the pilots had not stopped the cockpit voice recorder, so that the 30-minutes loop tape was overridden and vital information was lost for the investigators.
On 4 February 2004 at approximately 20:00 local time, a Cameroon Airlines 737-200 (registered TJ-AIO) suffered a blown tire upon take-off at Cotonou Airport, which resulted in a small fire that could be put out following an emergency landing.

References

External links

Cameroon Airlines (Archive)
Cameroon Airlines (Archive) 

 
Defunct airlines of Cameroon
Airlines established in 1971
Airlines disestablished in 2008
Government-owned airlines
Cameroonian companies established in 1971
2008 disestablishments in Africa